Sinistrofulgur perversum, the lightning whelk, is an edible species of very large predatory sea snail or whelk, a marine gastropod mollusc in the family Busyconidae, the busycon whelks. This species has a left-handed or sinistral shell.  It eats mostly bivalves.

There has been some disagreement about the correct scientific name for this species, which has been confused with Sinistrofulgur sinistrum Hollister, 1958, and Busycon contrarium (Conrad, 1840), which is an exclusively fossil species.

Distribution
This marine species is native to the Mid-Atlantic region of the United States and southeastern North America, from New Jersey south to Florida and the Gulf states.

Habitat
Lightning whelks can be found in the sandy or muddy substrate of shallow embayments.

Life habits
This whelk species feeds primarily on marine bivalves, ingesting their soft parts using its proboscis.

Sinistrofulgur perversum and Busycon carica
This species shares many characteristics with another species, the knobbed whelk Busycon carica, but there are some important differences:

Lightning whelks are sinistral in coiling, whereas knobbed whelks are dextral
Lightning whelks have a lower spire than the knobbed whelk
The knobs of the lightning whelk are usually less well-developed than those of the knobbed whelk
Lightning whelks are diurnal, while knobbed whelks are active both day and night
Lightning whelks prefer to stay in deeper waters than the knobbed whelks when feeding on mud flats

Human use
For thousands of years Native Americans used these animals as food, and used their shells for tools, ornaments, containers and to make jewelry, i.e. shell gorgets. They may have believed the sinistral nature of the lightning whelk shell made it a sacred object. The Minnesota Woman (lived c. 6000 BCE in modern Minnesota) wore a Sinistrofulgur perversum shell.

The lightning whelk is the "State Seashell of Texas".

Gallery

References

 Marquardt, W.M.  1992	Shell Artifacts from the Caloosahatchee Area.  In Culture and Environment in the Domain of the Calusa, edited by W. H. Marquardt, pp. 191–228. Institute of Archaeology and Paleoenvironmental Studies, Monograph 1. University of Florida, Gainesville.
 Paine, Robert T. 1962	Ecological Diversification in Sympatric Gastropods of the Genus Busycon.  Evolution 16(4):515-523.
 Pulley, T.E. 1959 Busycon perversum (Linné) and some related species.  Rice Institute Pamphlet, 46:70-89.
 Wise, J.B., G. Harasewych, & R. Dillon. 2004. Population divergence in the sinistral Busycon whelks of North America, with special reference to the east Florida ecotone. Marine Biology, 145:1163-1179; SMSFP Contrib.538.

External links

 Georgia Department of Natural Resources, Snails of the Sea
 Texas Parks and Wildlife, lightning whelks

perversum
Commercial molluscs
Seafood in Native American cuisine
Gastropods described in 1758
Taxa named by Carl Linnaeus
Symbols of Texas